Daniele Carnasciali (born 6 September 1966) is a retired Italian professional footballer who played as a right back.

Club career
Carnasciali played for 7 seasons (150 games, 2 goals) in the Italian Serie A for ACF Fiorentina, Bologna F.C. 1909 and A.C. Venezia.

In July 1997, he was sold to Bologna for 1.75 billion Italian lire, as part of Andrea Tarozzi's deal.

International career
Carnasciali made his debut for the Italy national football team on 21 December 1994 in a match against Turkey.

Honours

Club
Fiorentina
 Coppa Italia winner: 1995–96.
 Supercoppa Italiana winner: 1996.

References

External links
 

1966 births
Living people
Italian footballers
Italy international footballers
Serie A players
Serie B players
Mantova 1911 players
Spezia Calcio players
Brescia Calcio players
ACF Fiorentina players
Bologna F.C. 1909 players
Venezia F.C. players

Association football defenders